The Anglican Diocese of Kaduna is one of eleven within the Anglican Province of Kaduna, itself one of 14 provinces within the Church of Nigeria. The current bishop is Timothy Yahaya.

Notes

Church of Nigeria dioceses
Dioceses of the Province of Kaduna